Produce 101 is a South Korean reality television show where trainees compete to debut in a girl group.

Contestants
On the third episode, which aired on February 5, 2016, it was revealed that three trainees had left the show: Kim Ha-yun (101 Doors), Yim Kyung-ha (Astory Entertainment) and Lim Hyo-sun (CMG Chorok Stars). Ma Eun-jin of Clear Company join and left the show on the fourth episode due to health reasons.

English names are according to the official website.

Age is shown according to Korean age system.
Color key

Group Battle Performances (Episodes 3-4)
Color key

Position Evaluation Performances (Episodes 6-7)
Color key

Concept Evaluation Performances (Episode 9)
Color key

Debut Evaluation Performances (Episode 11)

 Bold denotes the center for the performance.

Notes

References

Produce 101 contestants
Produce 101
Produce 101 contestants
Produce 101 contestants
Produce 101 contestants
Produce 101 contestants
Lists of women